This is a list of compositions by Olivier Messiaen. Works are listed initially by genre and can be sorted chronologically by clicking on the "Date" header.

Messiaen's compositions include works for chamber ensemble, orchestra, vocal music, music for piano and organ, as well as some of the earliest electronic music, with his use of the ondes martenot in several of his compositions. Messiaen's work is characterised by rhythmic complexity, his interest in ornithology and birdcalls, and his system of modes of limited transposition.

List of compositions

Treatises
Technique de mon langage musical ("The technique of my musical language"). Paris: Leduc, 1944.
Vingt leçons d'harmonie ("20 harmony lessons"). Paris: Leduc, 1944.
Traité de rythme, de couleur, et d'ornithologie (1949–1992) ("Treatise on rhythm, colour and ornithology"), completed by Yvonne Loriod. 7 parts bound in 8 volumes. Paris: Leduc, 1994–2002.
Analyses of the Piano Works of Maurice Ravel, edited by Yvonne Loriod, translated by Paul Griffiths. [Paris]: Durand, 2005.

Sources
Benitez, Vincent P. (2007).  Olivier Messiaen: A Research and Information Guide Routledge, New York. 

Simeone, Nigel (1998).  Olivier Messiaen: a Bibliographical Catalogue of Messiaen’s Works, First Editions and First Performances. Schneider, Tutzing. 
Zinke-Bianchini, Virginie (1949). Olivier Messiaen, compositeur de musique et rythmicien : notice biographique, catalogue détaillé des œuvres éditées. L'Émancipatrice, Paris.

References

External links
 . An annotated works list, hosted by the Boston University Messiaen Project.
 . A more comprehensive annotated list of works, in order of composition, with details on first performances and publications, on a French wiki.
 . A short list of Messiaen's works, including early lost or discarded compositions, and published text writings by Messiaen, on the website oliviermessiaen.org.
 . Up to date, oliviermessiaen.org includes the latest recordings and concerts, a comprehensive bibliography, photos, analyses and reviews, a very extensive bio of Yvonne Loriod with discography, and more.

Messiaen, Olivier